Chaykino is a rural locality (a selo) in Krutishinsky Selsoviet, Shelabolikhinsky District, Altai Krai, Russia. The population was 243 as of 2013. There are 6 streets.

Geography 
Chaykino is located 63 km west of Shelabolikha (the district's administrative centre) by road. Bykovo is the nearest rural locality.

References 

Rural localities in Shelabolikhinsky District